Burnt Factory is an unincorporated community in Frederick County, Virginia, United States. Burnt Factory lies to the northeast of Winchester along Opequon Creek. The community is centered at the intersection of Burnt Factory and Jordan Springs Roads.

References

Unincorporated communities in Frederick County, Virginia
Unincorporated communities in Virginia